Kim Ga-young may refer to:
 Kim Ga-young (pool player)
 Kim Ga-young (actress)